Substituted phenylmorpholines, or substituted phenmetrazines alternatively, are chemical derivatives of phenylmorpholine or of the psychostimulant drug phenmetrazine. Most such compounds act as releasers of monoamine neurotransmitters, and have stimulant effects. Some also act as agonists at serotonin receptors, and compounds with an N-propyl substitution act as dopamine receptor agonists. A number of derivatives from this class have been investigated for medical applications, such as for use as anorectics or medications for the treatment of ADHD. Some compounds have also become subject to illicit use as designer drugs.

See also 
 Substituted amphetamine
 Substituted benzofuran
 Substituted cathinone
 Substituted methylenedioxyphenethylamine
 List of aminorex analogues
 List of methylphenidate analogues
 List of phenyltropanes
 List of cocaine analogues

References

External links 

Anorectics
 
Euphoriants
Norepinephrine-dopamine releasing agents
Chemical classes of psychoactive drugs